The 50th Filmfare Awards, honoring Cinema of India, took place on 26 February 2005 in Mumbai. This was the awards' golden jubilee year and to commemorate the occasion, the Filmfare award trophy (The Black Lady statue) was made in gold. Moreover, a special award: Best Film in 50 Years was also presented to Ramesh Sippy's Sholay (1975).

Veer-Zaara led the ceremony with 15 nominations, followed by Main Hoon Na with 12 nominations, Hum Tum and Swades with 8 nominations, and Yuva with 7 nominations each.

Yuva earned 6 awards, including Best Supporting Actor (for Abhishek Bachchan) and Best Supporting Actress (for Rani Mukherji), thus becoming the most-awarded film at the ceremony.

Shah Rukh Khan received triple nominations for Best Actor for his performances in Main Hoon Na, Swades and Veer-Zaara, winning for Swades.

Akshay Kumar received dual nominations for Best Supporting Actor for his performances in Khakee and Mujhse Shaadi Karogi, but lost to Abhishek Bachchan who won the award for Yuva.

Rani Mukherji set an unmatched record, becoming the only actress to win both popular female acting awards in the same year, winning Best Actress for Hum Tum and Best Supporting Actress for Yuva. She also received an additional Best Supporting Actress nomination for her performance in Veer-Zaara.

Main awards
Winners are indicated in bold.

Main Awards 
{| class="wikitable"
|-
! style="background:#EEDD82; width:50%;"|Best Film
! style="background:#EEDD82; width:50%;"|Best Director
|-
| valign="top" |
Veer-Zaara Dhoom
Hum Tum
Main Hoon Na
Swades
| valign="top" |Kunal Kohli – Hum Tum Ashutosh Gowariker – Swades
Farah Khan – Main Hoon Na
Farhan Akhtar – Lakshya
Rajkumar Santoshi – Khakee
Yash Chopra – Veer-Zaara
|-
! style="background:#EEDD82;"| Best Actor
! style="background:#EEDD82;"| Best Actress
|-
| valign="top" |Shah Rukh Khan – Swades  as Mohan Bhargava
Amitabh Bachchan – Khakee as D.C.P. Anand K. Srivastava
Hrithik Roshan – Lakshya as Karan Shergill
Shah Rukh Khan – Main Hoon Na as Ram Prasad Sharma
Shah Rukh Khan – Veer-Zaara as Sq. Ldr. Veer Pratap Singh 
Saif Ali Khan – Hum Tum as Karan Kapoor
| valign="top" |Rani Mukerji – Hum Tum  as Rhea Prakash
Aishwarya Rai – Raincoat as Neerja
Preity Zinta – Veer-Zaara as Zaara Hayaat Khan
Shilpa Shetty – Phir Milenge as Tamanna Sahni
Urmila Matondkar – Ek Hasina Thi as Sarika Vartak
|-
! style="background:#EEDD82;"| Best Supporting Actor
! style="background:#EEDD82;"| Best Supporting Actress
|-
| valign="top"|Abhishek Bachchan – Yuva as Lallan Singh
Akshay Kumar – Khakee as Senior Inspector Shekhar Verma
Akshay Kumar – Mujhse Shaadi Karogi as Sunny
Amitabh Bachchan – Veer-Zaara as Choudhary Sumer Singh
Zayed Khan – Main Hoon Na as Lakshman 'Lucky' Shekhar Sharma
| valign="top"|
Rani Mukerji – Yuva as Shashi Lal Biswas
Amrita Rao – Main Hoon Na as Sanjana Bakshi
Divya Dutta – Veer-Zaara as Shabana 'Shabbo' Ibrahim
Priyanka Chopra – Aitraaz as Sonia Roy
Rani Mukerji – Veer-Zaara as Saamiya Siddiqui
|-
! style="background:#EEDD82;"| Best Performance in a Comic Role
! style="background:#EEDD82;"| Best Performance in a Negative Role
|-
| valign="top"|
 Saif Ali Khan – Hum Tum  as Karan Kapoor
 Akshay Kumar – Mujhse Shaadi Karogi as Sunny
Arshad Warsi – Hulchul
Boman Irani – Main Hoon Na as Principal
Paresh Rawal – Hulchul
| valign="top"|
 Priyanka Chopra – Aitraaz  as Sonia Roy
 Abhishek Bachchan – Yuva as Lallan Singh
Ajay Devgan – Khakee as Yashwant Angre
John Abraham – Dhoom as Kabir
Sunil Shetty – Main Hoon Na as Raghavan Dutta
|-
! style="background:#EEDD82;"| Best Male Debut
! style="background:#EEDD82;"| Best Female Debut
|-
| valign="top"|
Not Awarded
| valign="top"|
 Ayesha Takia – Taarzan: The Wonder Car 
|-
! style="background:#EEDD82;"| Best Story
! style="background:#EEDD82;"| Best Screenplay
|-
| valign="top"|
 Veer-Zaara – Aditya Chopra | valign="top"|
 Yuva – Mani Ratnam  |-
! style="background:#EEDD82;"| Best Dialogue
! style="background:#EEDD82;"| Best Background Score
|-
| valign="top"|
 Veer-Zaara – Aditya Chopra | valign="top"|
 Swades – A. R. Rahman |-
! style="background:#EEDD82;"| Best Music Director
! style="background:#EEDD82;"| Best Lyricist
|-
| valign="top"|
 Main Hoon Na – Anu Malik  Dhoom – Pritam
 Hum Tum – Jatin–Lalit
Murder – Anu Malik
Swades – A. R. Rahman
Veer-Zaara – Madan Mohan
| valign="top"|
 Veer-Zaara – Javed Akhtar for "Tere Liye" Main Hoon Na – Javed Akhtar for "Main Hoon Na"
Swades – Javed Akhtar for "Yeh Taara Woh Taara"
Veer-Zaara – Javed Akhtar for "Aisa Des Hai Mera"
Veer-Zaara – Javed Akhtar for "Main Yahaan Hoon"
|-
! style="background:#EEDD82;"| Best Male Playback Singer
! style="background:#EEDD82;"| Best Female Playback Singer
|-
| valign="top"|
 Murder – Kunal Ganjawala for "Bheege Hont Tere" Main Hoon Na – Sonu Nigam for "Main Hoon Na"
Main Hoon Na – Sonu Nigam for "Tumse Milke"
Swades – Udit Narayan and Master Vignesh for "Yeh Taara Woh Taara"
Veer-Zaara – Sonu Nigam for "Do Pal"
Veer-Zaara – Udit Narayan for "Main Yahaan Hoon"
| valign="top"|
 Hum Tum – Alka Yagnik for "Hum Tum" Dhoom – Sunidhi Chauhan for "Dhoom Machale Dhoom"
Kyun! Ho Gaya Na... – Sadhana Sargam for "Aao Na"
Mujhse Shaadi Karogi – Alka Yagnik for "Lal Dupatta"
Swades – Alka Yagnik for "Saawariya"
|-
! style="background:#EEDD82;"| Best Action
! style="background:#EEDD82;"| Best Art Direction
|-
| valign="top"|Yuva – Vikram Dharma | valign="top"|Yuva – Sabu Cyril |-
! style="background:#EEDD82;"| Best Cinematography
! style="background:#EEDD82;"| Best Editing
|-
| valign="top"|Lakshya – Christopher Popp | valign="top"|Dhoom – Rameshwar S. Bhagat|-
! style="background:#EEDD82;"| Best Choreography
! style="background:#EEDD82;"| Best Sound Design
|-
| valign="top"|Lakshya – Prabhu Deva for "Main Aisa Kyun Hoon..."| valign="top"|Dhoom – Dwarak Warrier |-
! style="background:#EEDD82;"| Power Award
! style="background:#EEDD82;"| Best Scene of the Year
|-
| valign="top"|Shah Rukh Khan| valign="top"|Hum Tum |-
|}

Critics' Awards

Best FilmDev & Yuva

Best Actor
Pankaj Kapoor for Maqbool

Best Actress
Kareena Kapoor for Dev

R. D. Burman Award
Kunal Ganjawala

Lifetime Achievement Award
Rajesh Khanna

Best Film of 50 Years
Sholay

Major winners and nominees
Yuva – 6/7
Hum Tum – 5/8
Veer-Zaara – 4/15
Dev – 2/2
Lakshya – 2/4
Dhoom – 2/6
Swades – 2/8
Aitraaz – 1/2
Murder – 1/2
Taarzan: The Wonder Car – 1/1
Main Hoon Na – 1/12
Khakee – 0/4
Mujhse Shaadi Karogi – 0/3

See also
 Filmfare Awards
 51st Filmfare Awards
 List of highest-grossing Bollywood films

References

 Filmfare Awards at IMDb

Filmfare Awards
2005 Indian film awards

fr:Filmfare Awards 2008